Víctor Rodríguez Romero (born 23 July 1989) is a Spanish professional footballer who plays as a winger for Indian Super League club Odisha.

Club career
Born in Barberà del Vallès, Barcelona, Catalonia, Rodríguez played four years with FC Barcelona as a youth, sharing teams with future Valencia CF, Barcelona and Spain star Jordi Alba. Both were released for being deemed too small.

Rodríguez then signed for neighbours CF Badalona of the Segunda División B, going on to spend three full seasons at that level with the club. In 2012 he joined Real Zaragoza of La Liga, but initially as a member of the reserve team also in the third tier. He was introduced in the main squad setup by manager Manolo Jiménez shortly after, however, making his league debut on 25 August in a 2–1 away win against RCD Espanyol.

On 21 October 2012, in another 2–1 away victory, now over Granada CF, Rodríguez scored once and also provided the assist in Hélder Postiga's opener. As he had played in the number of first-team games required, he was immediately handed a professional contract, running until June 2015.

Rodríguez returned to the top flight on 7 August 2014, after agreeing to a three-year deal at Elche CF. On 2 August of the following year, he was loaned to Getafe CF of the same league for one year.

On 10 June 2016, after Getafe's relegation, Rodríguez signed a four-year contract with Sporting de Gijón also in the top tier. He met the same fate at the end of the season, then agreed to terminate his contract in order to join a Major League Soccer team, which turned out to be Seattle Sounders FC.

On 10 November 2019, Rodríguez was named the MVP of the 2019 MLS Cup Final, scoring the Sounders' second goal in a 3–1 home win over Toronto FC. The following 30 January, he returned to his former club Elche.

Rodríguez signed with Odisha FC in the Indian Super League in July 2022.

International career
Rodríguez featured for the Catalonia unofficial team.

Career statistics

Club

Honours
Seattle Sounders
MLS Cup: 2019

Individual
MLS Cup MVP: 2019

References

External links

1989 births
Living people
People from Vallès Occidental
Sportspeople from the Province of Barcelona
Spanish footballers
Footballers from Catalonia
Association football wingers
La Liga players
Segunda División players
Segunda División B players
Tercera División players
UE Vilajuïga footballers
CF Badalona players
Real Zaragoza B players
Real Zaragoza players
Elche CF players
Getafe CF footballers
Sporting de Gijón players
Major League Soccer players
Seattle Sounders FC players
Designated Players (MLS)
Indian Super League players
Odisha FC players
Catalonia international footballers
Spanish expatriate footballers
Expatriate soccer players in the United States
Expatriate footballers in India
Spanish expatriate sportspeople in the United States
Spanish expatriate sportspeople in India